The flag of Maastricht (or  ) is the official flag of Maastricht, the capital city of the province of Limburg, Netherlands. It constitutes a red vertical surface with a five-pointed star on its left side (a star that is common among many flags e.g., the flag of Chile). It had been a historical flag, with its first image of appearance dating from 1549, of the municipality but was replaced in 1938 with a flag similar in design to the Polish flag. To avoid confusion, the old flag was reinstated in 1994.

History

In 1438 the flag of Maastricht is described as being as a pigeon with olive branch on a white field, with the first historic image dating from 1545. The mentioned image was published in the Wappenbuch von Meister IK-book in Frankfurt am Main, Germany. However, in 1549, the flag is stated as being "yellow-white-red". In 1647, the white-star-on-red design had apparently returned when the Peace of Münster treaty was signed. The next known design is the white-red (with the upper part of the flag being white, and the lower part being red) design similar to the Polish flag. In 1993 it was decided by the municipal government to reinstate the first design and the flag was re-inaugurated on January 1, 1994.

Design

The height of the white star on the flag has to measure  of the entire flag. The white five-pointed star is placed so that the height above the star relates to the height under the star as 9 : 11. Furthermore, the proportions between the height and the width has to be 2:3. This design designation has been in use since 1994. The reasons for reselecting this design were varied. Firstly, there was to be no confusion with flags of other countries, provinces or cities. Secondly, the citizens of Maastricht were argued to feel more united by this design than the 1938-1994 design. Thirdly, the flag complies with the heraldric standards of the Netherlands. Finally, the colours of the Maastrichtian flag are white and vermilion, ones also used in the flag of the Netherlands.

Symbolism and misconceptions
 Before 1549: early flag design was a pigeon with olive branch in the canton.
 First and current design (after 1549, 1647-? (1938), 1994-): this flag does not bear any symbolism towards communism, a political ideology known for using many red symbolism e.g. the red flag.
 Second design (1938-1994): this flag was easily confused with the Polish flag and similar designs.

See also
Coat of arms of Maastricht

References

External links

 City flag information on the Maastrichtian municipal website Dutch

1545 in Europe
Culture in Maastricht
Maastricht
Maastricht